The Borchaly uezd was a county (uezd) of the Tiflis Governorate of the Caucasus Viceroyalty of the Russian Empire, and later of the independent and Soviet republics of Georgia. Its administrative center was the town of Shulavery (present-day Shaumiani). The area of the county roughly corresponded to the contemporary Lori Province of Armenia and the Kvemo Kartli region of Georgia.

History 

The Debed river, formerly known as the Borchala, gave the name of the uezd, however, the region was also known as Borchalo (ბორჩალო) in Georgian, Borchalu (Բորչալու) in Armenian, and Borchali in Azerbaijani. The Turkic locals were resettled to the Debed river valley through the policy of Shah Abbas I (1571-1629) after his successful campaigns against the Kingdoms of Kartli and Kakheti that led to the formation of several Qizilbash khanates. The region was later reincorporated into the Kingdom of Kartli in the 18th century, subsequently being incorporated into the Kartli-Kakheti monarchy in 1762. In 1801, through Russia's annexation of eastern Georgia, Borchaly became part of Russia's Georgia Governorate, which was eventually transformed to become the Tiflis Governorate.

Following the Russian Revolution and the short-lived independence of the Democratic Republic of Georgia and the First Republic of Armenia, the Borchaly uezd became the site of a 2-week-war between the two countries in December 1918, until its British-brokered ceasefire starting 1 January 1919. Most of northern Lori centered around Alaverdi was transformed into a neutral zone and patrolled by British troops of the 27th Division, until their mid-1919 withdrawal. Armenian and Georgian troops replaced the British forces in the neutral zone following the latter's withdrawal. The Armenians later complaining that the Georgian force was unsuccessfully trying to convince Tatar and Russian villages in the neutral zone to agree to join Georgia.

In late 1920, the neutral zone of Lori and the southernmost section of the Lori Uchastok which had been annexed to Armenia was with their permission reincorporated into Georgia for the safety of its inhabitants as a result of the Turkish-Armenian War. Georgia continued to administer the reunited Borchaly uezd until its Sovietization and the district's partition between the newly-formed Armenian and Georgian Soviet republics.

Administrative divisions 
The subcounties (uchastoks) of the Borchaly uezd in 1913 were as follows:

Demographics

Russian Empire Census 
The plurality of the population indicated Armenian to be their mother tongue, with significant Tatar, Greek, Russian, and Georgian speaking minorities.

Kavkazskiy kalendar 

See also
History of the administrative division of Russia

Notes

References

Bibliography 

Caucasus Viceroyalty (1801–1917)
Tiflis Governorate
Uezds of Tiflis Governorate
Modern history of Georgia (country)
1880 establishments in the Russian Empire
States and territories established in 1880
States and territories disestablished in 1918